Jolanda Elshof  (born ) is a retired Dutch female volleyball player. 
She was part of the Netherlands women's national volleyball team.

She participated in the 1994 FIVB Volleyball Women's World Championship, and won the European title at the 1995 Women's European Volleyball Championship.  On club level she played with Avero O.Sneek.

Clubs
 Avero O.Sneek (1994)

References

External links
http://www.legavolleyfemminile.it/?page_id=194&idat=ELS-JOL-75

1975 births
Living people
Dutch women's volleyball players
People from Soest, Netherlands
Sportspeople from Utrecht (province)
20th-century Dutch women